Grace Christian University is a private evangelical Christian university in Wyoming, Michigan. It is accredited by the Higher Learning Commission and the Association for Biblical Higher Education to award associate, baccalaureate, and graduate degrees. The university is affiliated with the Grace Gospel Fellowship.

History
An outgrowth of the Bible college movement of the late 19th century, Grace Christian University began as an evening Bible institute in 1939 to train Sunday School teachers and other lay church members of the Fundamental Bible Church in Milwaukee, Wisconsin, whose pastor was Charles F. Baker. The program was enlarged in 1945 to a day school and named Milwaukee Bible Institute, which was then renamed following broader curricular options in 1953 to Milwaukee Bible College with Charles Baker serving as president. John C. O’ Hair was the founder of Milwaukee Bible Institute. He was one of them that taught ultra-dispensationalism. In 1961 the college moved to a suburb of Grand Rapids (Wyoming, Michigan) and was renamed Grace Bible College. Successive presidents have been Jack Dean, Sam Vinton, Jr., Bruce Kemper, and Ken B. Kemper, who is the current president.

Academics
Today, the university has programs across numerous majors such as business, education, exercise science, history, human services, and others. Its most popular majors, by 2021 graduates, were:
Lay Ministry (28)
Human Services (25)
Psychology (12)
Business/Commerce (11)
Bible/Biblical Studies (10)

In 2018, the institution changed its name to Grace Christian University to reflect its broader educational mission.

References

External links
Official website

Association for Biblical Higher Education
Liberal arts colleges in Michigan
Bible colleges
Educational institutions established in 1945
Universities and colleges in Kent County, Michigan
1945 establishments in Michigan
Private universities and colleges in Michigan